Valle del Cinca is a Spanish geographical indication for Vino de la Tierra wines located in the wine-producing area of the Cinca Valley, in the province of Huesca, in the autonomous region of Aragon, Spain. Vino de la Tierra is one step below the mainstream Denominación de Origen indication on the Spanish wine quality ladder.

The area covered by this geographical indication comprises about 15 municipalities in the province of Huesca (Aragon, Spain).

It acquired its Vino de la Tierra status in 2005.

Grape varieties
 White: Macabeo, Garnacha blanca, Chardonnay, Moscatel de Alejandría, Sauvignon blanc, Chenin, Gewürtztraminer, Malvasía and Riesling
 Red: Mazuela, Cabernet Sauvignon, Merlot, Tempranillo, Garnacha Graciano, Syrah, Cabernet franc, Moristel, Parraleta and Pinot noir

References

Spanish wine
Wine regions of Spain
Aragonese cuisine
Geography of the Province of Huesca
Wine-related lists
Appellations